Ruth Rifkin (February 1, 1912  - July 24, 1989) was an American who worked for the predecessor agency which later became the United Nations Relief and Rehabilitation Administration (UNRRA) during World War II. Rifkin also was a source for Golos-Bentley network of spies that worked for Soviet intelligence and was engaged in espionage on behalf of the Soviet Union.

References

 Elizabeth Bentley deposition 30 November 1945, FBI file 65-14603. 
 John Earl Haynes and Harvey Klehr, Venona: Decoding Soviet Espionage in America, Yale University Press (1999), pgs. 379, 471.

American spies for the Soviet Union
1989 deaths
1912 births